FCK may refer to:

 F.C. Copenhagen, a Danish football club
 1. FC Kaiserslautern, a German  football club
 FC Koper, a Slovenian football club
 Furnace Creek Airport, near Death Valley, California, United States
 FCK (print ad), an award-winning ad for KFC UK
 Flat-chested kitten syndrome, a feline disorder